Raptor Ranch (also known as The Dinosaur Experiment) is a 2012 science fiction action adventure horror comedy film written and directed by Dan Bishop. Produced by Stephan Galfas, Mosh Moe Grunberg and Shlomo May-Zur, it stars Jana Mashonee and Lorenzo Lamas.

Plot
A modern-day Texas community is overrun by vicious prehistoric raptors and a group of people try to survive the raptor onslaught at a cattle ranch.

In Fossil Ridge, Texas, a reclusive, Dr. Cane experimenting with bird DNA, managed to create several species of carnivorous dinosaurs. One of them gets loose and causes a string of killings, drawing the attention of the police and the FBI who send two agents to investigate.

Abbi Whitecloud, a waitress and aspiring singer whose mother was one of the casualties, is forced to work for her demanding boss, Eddie Wayne to pay off a debt. Entering Fossil Ridge are college buddies Sheldon, Lucas, and "Manbeast", who run out of gas, and touring band Little Willie and the Willettes, who suffer engine trouble. Abbi agrees to take Sheldon and Manbeast to the rancher's property for gasoline. They are accompanied by Willie's drummer, Kolin. The rancher suffers a heart attack and Manbeast is devoured after accidentally releasing the rest of the dinosaurs.

Abbi, Sheldon, and Kolin return to Abbi's house to find her boss there, who is subsequently eaten by a T-rex. It then trashes Abbi's house while going after her and her friends. As they escape, they are chased by a pair of Megalosaurs, but Abbi is able to fend them off with a bow and arrows. They return to the gas station to find Lucas as the only survivor; Willie and Willie's band member, Josie has been killed by raptors. After attempting to escape in Willie's broken down tour bus, they are trapped by the dinosaurs and hide in a store. Kolin finds a book containing the dinosaurs' origins. Lucas is eaten by the T-rex in an attempt to fight it. A few hours later, the others escape the store and make it to a factory while the dinosaurs converge and fight one another, with the Megalosaurus emerging victorious.

The Megalosaurus tracks them to a processing plant and in the ensuing chase, Kolin and Sheldon are crushed to death by the rampaging reptile. Abbi lures the dinosaur to a different part of the factory containing flammables, pours gasoline onto the floor and ignites it, incinerating the beast. She is then taken into custody by the FBI agents, who release her and cover up the incident by attributing it to attacks by "killer emus" or "the chupacabra".

One year later, Abbi finally realizes her dream as a cabaret singer and is performing in an undisclosed nightclub. As her show wraps up, a surviving raptor appears and pounces at the screen.

Cast
 Jana Mashonee as Abbi Whitecloud
 Lorenzo Lamas as FBI Special Agent Logan
 Cole Brown as Billy Wayne
 Donny Boaz as Lucas Young
 Cody Vaughan as Sheldon Macabeach
 Lexy Hulme  as Kolin
 Kimberly Matula as Josie Hutchens
 Rowdy Arroyo as Man Beast
 Marcus M. Mauldin as Wllie "Little Willie"
 Declan Joyce as FBI Special Agent O'Reilly
 Carrie Newell as Deputy Jones
 Jack Gould as Dr. Cane
 Ines Brigman as FBI Agent Atwood
 Tooraj Ban as FBI Agent Niro
 Billy Sawilchik as FBI Agent Logan
 Al Burke as Sheriff Morgan
 Kyle Little as Eddie Wayne
 Charlene Gleeson as Carrie Ann
 Dan Bishop as Professor (Danny Bishop)
 David Bowman as Man With Shotgun

Production

Filming
Filmed on location in St. Petersburg, Russia, Leonard and Celeste, Texas, and in Los Angeles, California.

References

External links

Films shot in Russia
Films shot in Texas
Films shot in Los Angeles
Films set in Texas
2012 films
2010s science fiction films
Films about dinosaurs
2010s adventure films
2010s English-language films